Joop van Daele (born 14 August 1947 in Rotterdam) is a retired Dutch footballer who was active as a defender.

Club career
Van Daele joined the Feijenoord youth set-up in 1960 from local amateurs Overmaas and stayed with the Rotterdam giants until 1977. In 1970, he won the European Cup and the Intercontinental Cup. He scored the winning goal in the homematch, the return final of the latter tournament, against Estudiantes.

He also had a short loan spell at Go Ahead Eagles and played for Fortuna Sittard before finishing his career at Excelsior.

"Het brilletje van Van Daele"
He claimed his name in the history books during the second leg of the 1970 Intercontinental Cup Final against tough-tackling Estudiantes in Rotterdam. Van Daele scored the winning goal and during the goal celebrations his glasses were ripped off by the Argentinians and allegedly smashed to pieces on the pitch by Carlos Pachamé. The incident prompted Toon Hermans to write a song about it and it was recorded by actor Luc Lutz after van Daele declined to sing it himself. Johnny Hoes also released a single with Van Daele de klusjesman (Van Daele the handyman) on the one side and Waar is de bril van Joop van Daele (Where are Joop van Daele's glasses?) on the other.

Managerial career
After retiring as a player, van Daele was assistant manager at former clubs Fortuna and Excelsior before appointed manager at amateur side Papendrecht and as head coach at Excelsior.

In 2006, he was appointed scout at Feyenoord.

Honours

Player
Feijenoord
 Intercontinental Cup (1): 1970
 European Cup (1): 1970
 UEFA Cup (1): 1974
 Eredivisie (3): 1968–69, 1970–71, 1973–74, 
 KNVB Cup (1) : 1968–69

References

External links
 Career stats - Feyenoord
 Profile - Lunatic News (Feyenoord fansite) 

1947 births
Living people
Footballers from Rotterdam
Association football defenders
Dutch footballers
Feyenoord players
Go Ahead Eagles players
Fortuna Sittard players
Excelsior Rotterdam players
Eredivisie players
Dutch football managers
Excelsior Rotterdam managers
UEFA Cup winning players